In q-analog theory, the -gamma function, or basic gamma function, is a generalization of the ordinary gamma function closely related to the double gamma function. It is given by

when , and

if . Here  is the infinite q-Pochhammer symbol. The -gamma function satisfies the functional equation

In addition, the -gamma function satisfies the q-analog of the Bohr–Mollerup theorem, which was found by Richard Askey.
For non-negative integers n,

where  is the q-factorial function. Thus the -gamma function can be considered as an extension of the q-factorial function to the real numbers.

The relation to the ordinary gamma function is made explicit in the limit

There is a simple proof of this limit by Gosper.

Transformation properties
The -gamma function satisfies the q-analog of the Gauss multiplication formula:

Integral representation
The -gamma function has the following integral representation:

Stirling formula
Moak obtained the following q-analogue of the Stirling formula (see ):

Raabe-type formulas

Due to I. Mező, the q-analogue of the Raabe formula exists, at least if we use the q-gamma function when . With this restriction

El Bachraoui considered the case  and proved that

Special values

The following special values are known.

These are the analogues of the classical formula .

Moreover, the following analogues of the familiar identity  hold true:

Matrix Version
Let  be a complex square matrix and Positive-definite matrix. Then a q-gamma matrix function can be defined by q-integral:

where  is the q-exponential function.

Other q-gamma functions
For other q-gamma functions, see Yamasaki 2006.

Numerical computation
An iterative algorithm to compute the q-gamma function was proposed by Gabutti and Allasia.

Further reading

References

Gamma and related functions
Q-analogs